Piletocera orientalis is a moth in the family Crambidae. It was described by Snellen in 1880. It is found in Indonesia (Sulawesi).

References

orientalis
Endemic fauna of Indonesia
Moths of Indonesia
Fauna of Sulawesi
Moths described in 1880